Jameson Clark (born 1972 in Starr, South Carolina) is an American country music singer. Between 2001 and 2002, he recorded for Capitol Records and charted two singles: "Don't Play Any Love Songs" and "You da Man", in addition to releasing an album titled Workin' on a Groove.

Ray Waddell of Billboard magazine gave Workin' on a Groove a mostly-positive review, saying that Clark "is having himself a good ol' time". It also received a positive review from Matt Bjorke of About.com, who compared Clark's sound to Dwight Yoakam, Toby Keith, and Hank Williams III.

Workin' on a Groove (2002)

Track listing
"Waitin' on the Whiskey" (Jameson Clark, Mark Irwin) – 2:32
"You da Man" (Clark, Craig Wiseman) – 3:47
"I'm Gonna Burn for This" (Clark, Irwin, Josh Kear) – 3:09
"All Afternoon" (Clark, Irwin, Kear) – 3:27
"I Want It All" (Clark, Irwin, Kear) – 4:03
"I Like Blondes" (Clark, Bob Regan) – 3:36
"Workin' on a Groove" (Clark, Irwin, Kear) – 3:41
"When I'm Done" (Clark, Irwin) – 4:01

Singles

Music videos

References

1972 births
American country singer-songwriters
Capitol Records artists
Living people
Country musicians from South Carolina
American male singer-songwriters
21st-century American singers
21st-century American male singers